Dzięcioły may refer to the following places:
Dzięcioły, Greater Poland Voivodeship (west-central Poland)
Dzięcioły, Łosice County in Masovian Voivodeship (east-central Poland)
Dzięcioły, Wołomin County in Masovian Voivodeship (east-central Poland)